Philippe Mestre (23 August 1927 – 25 April 2017) was a French high-ranking civil servant, media executive and politician. He was the prefect of Gers, Lower Normandy, Calvados, Pays de la Loire and Loire-Atlantique. He was the chief executive of Presse-Océan from 1981 to 1993. He served as a member of the National Assembly from 1981 to 1993, representing Vendée. He was the Minister of Veteran Affairs and War Victims from 1993 to 1995. He was a commander of the Legion of Honour and an officer of the National Order of Merit.

References

1927 births
2017 deaths
People from Vendée
Politicians from Pays de la Loire
Union for French Democracy politicians
French Ministers of Veterans Affairs
Deputies of the 7th National Assembly of the French Fifth Republic
Deputies of the 8th National Assembly of the French Fifth Republic
Deputies of the 9th National Assembly of the French Fifth Republic
Deputies of the 10th National Assembly of the French Fifth Republic
Prefects of Gers
Prefects of Calvados (department)
Prefects of Loire-Atlantique
Commandeurs of the Légion d'honneur
Officers of the Ordre national du Mérite